National Events Center (NEC) is a government department in Saudi Arabia that is responsible for overseeing state-sponsored events and festivals (like Saudi Seasons) across the country in cooperation with relevant agencies. Established through a royal decree by King Salman against the backdrop of the COVID-19 pandemic in March 2020, it is affiliated with the Council of Economic and Development Affairs, one of the two subcabinets of Saudi Arabia.

History 
The National Events Center was established through a royal decree issued by King Salman on March 10, 2020, against the backdrop of the COVID-19 pandemic in Saudi Arabia. In October 2021, the department launched the "Matloob" platform during the Riyadh Season which aimed to facilitate and organize the participation of individuals and companies in the events and seasons of Saudi Arabia.

Partner agencies 
The National Events Center manages and oversees state-sponsored events in Saudi Arabia through relevant agencies, which include

 General Entertainment Authority
 Ministry of Culture
 Ministry of Sport
 Ministry of Tourism
 Saudi Conventions and Exhibitions General Authority

References 

Government agencies of Saudi Arabia
2020 establishments in Saudi Arabia